Ciocoiu is a surname. Notable people with the surname include:

Cristian Ciocoiu (born 1975), Romanian footballer
Emil Ciocoiu (1948–2020), Romanian painter and photographer

Romanian-language surnames